Óscar Chávez (20 March 1935 – 30 April 2020) was a Mexican singer, songwriter and actor. He was the major proponent of the Nueva Trova movement in Mexico in the 1960s and 1970s.

Career and education

Chavez studied theatre at the National Autonomous University of Mexico (UNAM) and went on to produce and act in several plays, movies and telenovelas in Mexico. He achieved international fame through his music. His songs "Por Ti" and "Macondo" are particularly well-known in Latin America. In addition, Chavez recorded many Mexican folk songs.

Chavez was noted for his strong commitment to social causes and the left-wing ideas expressed in his lyrics. His discography spanned four decades.

Death
Chávez died on 30 April 2020 from COVID-19 during the COVID-19 pandemic in Mexico.  He was 85.

References

External links
 Trovadictos Biography and commentary. 
 Con estos corridos Óscar Chávez les dijo sus verdades a los políticos 
 

1935 births
2020 deaths
Singers from Mexico City
Mexican songwriters
Male songwriters
20th-century Mexican male singers
21st-century Mexican male singers
National Autonomous University of Mexico alumni
Deaths from the COVID-19 pandemic in Mexico